Head Lopper is a comic book series created by writer and artist Andrew MacLean, currently published by Image Comics. The story follows the exploits of the Viking warrior Norgal (or "head lopper", as some call him) and the severed head of Agatha the Blue Witch.

Publishing history
Head Lopper originally began as a self-published project by comics creator Andrew MacLean. In 2015 it was picked up for a four-issue miniseries.

The character originated from a piece for Brand New Nostalgia. The theme of the week had been Vikings, and a bearded warrior with a witch's head skewered on his sword was the result.

Self-published issues
Head Lopper #1 debuted at Heroes Con 2013. The first issue was a small print run and thus costly to produce. The second issue was funded via a Kickstarter campaign launched October 10, 2013.

Image Comics issues
In 2015 Image Comics picked up Head Lopper as a "quarterly adventure comic". The series eschewed the industry standard 22-page monthly issues in favor of a larger issues published quarterly.

In April 2016 MacLean announced on various social media channels that Image Comics had picked up Head Lopper for another miniseries in 2017.

Crossover
In October 2019, Norgal and Agatha appeared in two short stories in Rumble  Vol. 2 #17. The first, "Belly of Hell", was drawn by Andrew MacLean and the second, "Deceitful Above All Things", was drawn by James Harren. Both stories were written by John Arcudi. The events of these stories are in continuity and referenced in Head Lopper #16. These stories were collected in Rumble – Volume 6: Last Knight and Head Lopper & the Quest for Mulgrid's Stair.

Collections

Premise
The series follows the adventures of the legendary swordsman Norgal, dubbed the Head Lopper, and his companion, the severed head of Agatha Blue Witch, as they trek across the realm to fulfill their quests, uncovering mysteries whilst encountering friends and foes along the way.

Reception
The Kickstarter for the self-published Head Lopper 2: The Wolves of Barra was funded with only 544 backers, but strong word of mouth and reviews led to the series being picked up by Image Comics. The Image Comics incarnation of Head Lopper has had strong reviews since its debut, with MacLean's artwork and sense of humor and Bellaire's coloring receiving consistently high praise.

References

External links
 
 Andrew MacLean's official website

2013 comics debuts
Image Comics titles
Fantasy comics